(Franz) Peter Utzelmann (1 May 1896-1972) was German communist. He was a founding member of the Communist Workers' Party of Germany (KAPD). He was the coordinator of the strike committee at the Leuna works.
Over 25,000 workers at the plant went on strike during the March Action in 1921.

References

1896 births
1972 deaths
German communists